Vujan is a mountain in central Serbia, near the town of Gornji Milanovac. Its highest peak Veliki Vujan has an elevation of 856 meters above sea level. It is the site of the Vujan Monastery.

References

Mountains of Serbia
Gornji Milanovac
Rhodope mountain range